No Romeo is the debut studio album by English singer Lauren Henson, known professionally as Indiana. It was originally scheduled to be released on 1 September 2014, but has been subject to several pushbacks and was eventually released on 16 January 2015. The album spawned six singles: "Bound", "Smoking Gun", "Mess Around", "Solo Dancing" and "Heart on Fire". No Romeo was produced mainly by Henson's writing partner, John Beck.

The album debuted at number 17 on the UK Albums Chart, selling 3,646 copies in its first week.

Track listing

Charts

Release history

References

2015 debut albums
Albums produced by Jesse Shatkin
Epic Records albums